United States v. Detroit Timber & Lumber Company, 200 U.S. 321 (1906), is a decision of the Supreme Court of the United States. Although the primary issue to the parties of the case was to determine ownership of 44 tracts of timberland, the case has become the standard reference to warn attorneys not to rely on the syllabus of a reported case.

Prior to Detroit Lumber, the Reporter of Decisions had mischaracterized the holding of Hawley v. Diller in its syllabus for that case. The attorneys representing the United States in Detroit Timber relied on the Hawley syllabus (which incorrectly reported the case) rather than the text of the actual decision (which actually represents the results). The Court pointed out that the headnote is not the work of the Supreme Court and cannot be relied upon to state the Court's decision. Also, for the case cited, the headnote in question had misinterpreted the scope of the decision.

All syllabi issued by the Supreme Court now include a paragraph of boilerplate text to warn readers not to rely on the syllabus for the actual meaning of the decision.

See also
 List of United States Supreme Court cases, volume 200

References

External links
 
 

1906 in United States case law
1906 in Detroit
February 1906 events
United States Supreme Court cases
United States Supreme Court cases of the Fuller Court
Forests of Michigan